A new car is an automobile that is sold in its original manufactured condition, usually by a retail business known as a car dealership. The term is contrasted with used car, an automobile which has previously had one or more owners.

New Car may also refer to:

 New Car (Up All Night), 2011 episode of American TV comedy series Up All Night
 New Car (The Americans), 2014 episode of American TV drama series The Americans

See also
 The New Cars